Platycnemis acutipennis, known as the Orange Featherleg or the Orange White-legged Damselfly, is a species of damselfly in the family Platycnemididae.

Description
Platycnemis acutipennis is the only European damselfly which combines an orange-red abdomen and blue eyes. The male has moderately wide hind tibias (wider in both P. pennipes and P. latipes; and the males of both those species have blue abdomens). The thorax is buff-coloured with black stripes. There is an orange spot near the tip of each wing. The sexes are similar.

Behaviour 
Platycnemis acutipennis lives in fresh water, either still or up to moderately fast-flowing.

Distribution 
Platycnemis acutipennis is common and widely distributed across the southwest of Europe including Portugal, Spain, and France; it is endemic to that area. There are however some recent records from Germany.

References

External links 
 Aesnature: Platycnemis acutipennis (images showing mating and egg-laying behaviour)

Platycnemididae
Damselflies of Europe
Insects described in 1841